Mikaela Parmlid (born 22 September 1980) is a professional golfer born in Gothenburg, Sweden.

Amateur career
Parmlid attended Göteborgs Högre Samskola and Chaparral High in Scottsdale, Arizona. In 1997 she won the Swedish High School Championship, and she was the 1998 Nordic Junior Champion and the 1998 Teen Tour Champion. In 1999 she was the top female amateur at the Chrysler Open, an LET event, and she was the top amateur at the Compaq Open, also an LET event, for four consecutive years (1999–2002).

Parmlid was the 2003 NCAA individual champion while an economics major at University of Southern California and a member of the 2003 NCAA Championship Team. She won five collegiate tournaments in total. Parmlid was the 2003 Honda Sports Award winner and a nine-time member of the Swedish National Team.

Professional career
Parmlid turned professional in 2003 and earned exempt status for the 2004 LPGA Tour season. She recorded a LPGA career-best tie for eighth at the Jamie Farr Owens Corning Classic in 2009, where she also carded a career-low 62 (-9) in the third round.

Parmlid had a successful 2012 season on the Ladies European Tour, where she finished runner-up at the UNIQA Ladies Golf Open behind Caroline Hedwall, tied third at the ISPS Handa Ladies British Masters, and tied fourth at the Deutsche Bank Ladies Swiss Open. A win proving elusive, in 2013, her last full season on the LET, she matched her career-best result as runner-up at the Open de España Femenino. 

She was inducted into the WGCA Players Hall of Fame in 2013.

Professional wins

Nordea Tour 
2013 Delsjö Ladies Open
2014 Delsjö Ladies Open

Amateur wins
1997 Swedish High School champion
1998 Nordic Junior champion
1998 Teen Tour champion
2002 Peg Barnard Collegiate champion
2003 NCAA team and individual champion while at University of Southern California

Team appearances
Amateur
European Ladies' Team Championship (representing Sweden): 2001 (winners), 2003
Espirito Santo Trophy (representing Sweden): 2002

Professional
International Crown (representing Sweden): 2014

References

External links

Swedish female golfers
USC Trojans women's golfers
LPGA Tour golfers
Ladies European Tour golfers
Sportspeople from Gothenburg
1980 births
Living people